Kattem IL is a Norwegian sports club from the neighborhood Kattem in Heimdal borough, Trondheim. It has sections for football, handball, ice hockey and skiing.

The women's football team has been in Toppserien, the highest tier of women's football in Norway. It gained promotion after the 2006 season after one year in the First Division (second tier), having been relegated in 2005.

The men's team won played in the Third Division (fourth tier) in from 2007 to 2010.

Recent history 
{|class="wikitable"
|-bgcolor="#efefef"
! Season
!
! Pos.
! Pl.
! W
! D
! L
! GS
! GA
! P
!Cup
!Notes
|-
|2006
|1D
|align=right bgcolor=silver|2
|align=right|18||align=right|13||align=right|4||align=right|1
|align=right|41||align=right|26||align=right|43
|3rd round
|Promoted to Toppserien
|-
|2007
|TS
|align=right |10
|align=right|22||align=right|5||align=right|4||align=right|13
|align=right|24||align=right|55||align=right|19
|3rd round
|
|-
|2008
|TS
|align=right |10
|align=right|22||align=right|5||align=right|2||align=right|15
|align=right|21||align=right|67||align=right|17
|2nd round
|
|-
|2009
|TS
|align=right |9
|align=right|22||align=right|7||align=right|4||align=right|11
|align=right|28||align=right|45||align=right|25
|3rd round
|
|-
|2010
|TS
|align=right |10
|align=right|22||align=right|4||align=right|2||align=right|16
|align=right|17||align=right|58||align=right|14
|2nd round
|
|-
|2011
|TS
|align=right |9
|align=right|22||align=right|5||align=right|4||align=right|13
|align=right|36||align=right|60||align=right|19
|3rd round
|
|-
|2012
|TS
|align=right |11
|align=right|22||align=right|5||align=right|3||align=right|14
|align=right|34||align=right|56||align=right|16
|3rd round
|
|}

External links
 Official site

Football clubs in Norway
Association football clubs established in 1979
Sport in Trondheim
1979 establishments in Norway